The 2006 Copa do Brasil was the 18th staging of the Copa do Brasil.

The competition started on February 15, 2006 and concluded on July 26, 2006 with the second leg of the final, held at the Estádio do Maracanã in Rio de Janeiro, in which Flamengo lifted the trophy for the second time with a 1–0 victory over its rival Vasco da Gama.

Valdiram, of Vasco da Gama, with 7 goals, was the competition's topscorer.

Format
The competition was disputed by 64 clubs in a knock-out format where all rounds were played over two legs and the away goals rule was used, but in the first two rounds if the away team won the first leg with an advantage of at least two goals, the second leg was not played and the club automatically qualified to the next round.

Competition stages

Finals

References
 Copa do Brasil 2006 at RSSSF

Copa do Brazil
Copa do Brazil
2006